Pseudohaploceras  is a genus of desmosceratid ammonites from the Early Cretaceous; Valanginian to Albian epochs.

Description 
The genus is distinguished by its moderately involute, slightly to moderately compressed shell with convex sides and regular straight or sinuous constrictions between which are fairly fine, distinct, sharp or rounded branching ribs extending from the umbilical edge and crossing the venter, the outer rim.

Pseudohaploceras is considered an offshoot of early Valdedorsella, which differ in having a more broadly rounded whorl section and generally straight radial constrictions. It is included in the subfamily Pizosiinae.

Distribution 
Fossils of Pseudohaploceras have been found in Austria, Bulgaria, China, Colombia (Tibasosa Formation, Santa Rosa de Viterbo and Yuruma and Apón Formations, La Guajira), Egypt, Italy, Japan, Mexico, Serbia and Montenegro, Spain, Tanzania, and the former USSR.

References

Further reading 
 

Ammonitida genera
Cretaceous ammonites
Early Cretaceous genus first appearances
Early Cretaceous genus extinctions
Ammonites of Africa
Cretaceous Africa
Ammonites of Asia
Cretaceous Asia
Ammonites of Europe
Cretaceous Europe
Fossils of Serbia
Ammonites of North America
Cretaceous Mexico
Ammonites of South America
Cretaceous Colombia
Paja Formation
Fossil taxa described in 1900